The 2002 election was held on November 5 to elect the Attorney General of New York. Democratic incumbent Eliot Spitzer was reelected by a wide margin, defeating Republican Dora Irizarry.

General election

Polling

Results

References

See also
New York gubernatorial election, 2002
New York Comptroller election, 2002
United States House of Representatives elections in New York, 2002

2002 New York (state) elections
2002
New York